Gargantua (Edward Cobert) is a fictional character appearing in American comic books published by Marvel Comics.

Publication history

Gargantua first appeared in The New Defenders #126 and was created by Alan Kupperberg and J.M. DeMatteis.

Fictional character biography
Edward Cobert started out as a S.H.I.E.L.D. agent and scientist working on an experiment called Project: Lazarus (also known as the Olympus Project). The project went horribly wrong when he tested it on himself, causing Edward to be stuck in giant-size with a greatly limited intelligence. He went on a rampage until he was subdued by S.H.I.E.L.D., and was dubbed Leviathan. However, he escaped S.H.I.E.L.D. custody and battled the Defenders who managed to subdue him. He was later freed from S.H.I.E.L.D. custody by Professor Power and the Secret Empire who arranged for his release and used him as a henchman, but he was defeated by the Defenders again.

The Secret Empire freed him again when the Defenders infiltrated the Secret Empire's HQ and he helped capture the Defenders. Even so, the Defenders escaped and overthrew the Secret Empire again.

Leviathan later became the guardian of another incarnation of the Secret Empire. Again a henchman of Professor Power, he battled and was defeated by the duo known at the time as Captain America and Bucky (and who later became known as the U.S. Agent and Battlestar, respectively).

Edward Cobert later became a pawn of the Mad Thinker who gave him the new costumed guise of Gargantua. The Mad Thinker used Gargantua as a field agent, hoping that he would be publicly defeated by Wasp and Wonder Man (who were engaged at the time in high-profile protests against the government's first proposed legislation regarding superhero registration/regulation). As planned, they defeated Gargantua, and Mad Thinker helped sway the public opinion against the legislation.

While in the Vault, Gargantua joined the Wizard and the Force of Nature in a riot against the Guardsmen, who would not allow Terraformer access to plant life. Vance Astrovik, who was also incarcerated there, calmed both the prisoners and guards when he brought Terraformer a plant from the warden's office.

Gargantua later became a part-time member of Doctor Octopus' Masters of Evil where they plotted to storm Avengers Mansion while the Avengers were away. This was made easier when many of the superheroes were replaced with evil doppelgängers of them during the Infinity War. The Masters of Evil were thwarted by the Guardians of the Galaxy who were visiting Avengers Mansion at the time. Both teams had to work together to stop the doppelgängers. Gargantua was among the members who revolted against Doctor Octopus when he wanted to continue the fight against the Guardians. After Doctor Octopus fled, his Masters of Evil disbanded.

When it came to a small town that was renamed Hulk, Gargantua joined two other super-strong villains, the Abomination and Titania, into attacking it to lure out the Hulk. They retreated when they realized that the Hulk was not there.

During the Avengers: Standoff! storyline, Gargantua was an inmate of Pleasant Hill, a gated community established by S.H.I.E.L.D.

Powers and abilities
Thanks to artificial cellular enhancement, Gargantua formerly can grow in stature and power by drawing upon extra-dimensional mass from an unknown source. He has severely limited intelligence as a side effect to this mutation, leaving it below normal.

Edward Cobert was a S.H.I.E.L.D. Academy graduate and earned his Ph.D. in biochemistry before the treatment.

Other versions

JLA/Avengers
In the JLA/Avengers crossover, Gargantua was among the villains pulled from time and space by Krona to guard his stronghold from the Avengers and the Justice League.

References

External links
 Gargantua at Marvel.com

Characters created by J. M. DeMatteis
Comics characters introduced in 1983
Fictional characters with superhuman durability or invulnerability
Fictional secret agents and spies in comics
Fictional special forces personnel
Marvel Comics characters with superhuman strength
Marvel Comics giants
Marvel Comics male supervillains
Marvel Comics mutates
Marvel Comics scientists
Marvel Comics supervillains